Anisarchus is a genus of marine ray-finned fishes belonging to the family Stichaeidae, the pricklebacks or shannies. These fishes are found in the North Pacific Ocean.

Species
Anisarchus contains the following species:

References

Lumpeninae
Taxa named by Theodore Gill